Zasosna is a rural locality (a selo) and the administrative center of Zasosenskoye Rural Settlement, Krasnogvardeysky District, Belgorod Oblast, Russia. Its population was   There are 34 streets.

Geography 
Zasosna is located 3 km south of Biryuch (the district's administrative centre) by road. Biryuch is the nearest rural locality.

References 

Rural localities in Krasnogvardeysky District, Belgorod Oblast